Sounding Point is the debut studio album by the then 21-year-old jazz guitarist Julian Lage. It was released in March 2009 by EmArcy Records. It entered the Billboard Top Contemporary Jazz Albums chart at number 13 and was nominated for the 2010 Grammy Award for Best Contemporary Jazz Album. Reviews of the album were generally positive; one reviewer found the recording inferior to Lage's live performances.

Overview

Sounding Point was recorded when Lage was 20 years old. He plays an acoustic Martin D-18GE and an  electric Linda Manzer archtop on the record.

The album was nominated for the 2010 Grammy Award for Best Contemporary Jazz Album but lost to the Joe Zawinul album 75. The other nominees were Urbanus by Stefon Harris, At World's Edge by Philippe Saisse, and Big Neighborhood by Mike Stern.

Various ensembles
Lage performs two solo tracks on the release, the remainder of the album consists of pieces played by three separate combos. There are two duets, "Tour One" and "All Blues", with pianist Taylor Eigsti and three all-string bluegrass inspired numbers, "The Informant", "Long Day, Short Night", and "Alameda", with Chris Thile on mandolin and Béla Fleck on banjo. The remaining six tracks are played by some combination of Lage's touring band; saxophonist Ben Roseth, cellist Aristides Rivas, bassist Jorge Roeder, and percussionist Tupac Mantilla. There are no trap drums on the recording, Mantilla plays cajón, djembe, frame drums and cymbals.

Selected tracks
The album's opening track, "Clarity" was written by Lage when he was 15 years old for Gary Burton's album Next Generation. It was rewritten for this release to feature the cello playing of Aristides Rivas. "All Purpose Beginning" is about writing a letter to a friend. It starts with the sound of a pencil writing on paper. The album's closing track, "All Blues" is a cover of the Miles Davis composition. There are two other covers, Elliott Smith's "Alameda" and Neal Hefti's "Lil' Darlin'", a piece made famous by Count Basie.

Critical reception

David Wiegand in his review in the San Francisco Chronicle wrote that Lage "demonstrates a jaw-dropping stylistic range and thrilling technique" on this "exquisite" album. In his review in The Washington Post, Geoffrey Himes called Lage "a jazz newcomer more interested in elegance than in flash, more interested in instrumental storytelling than in virtuosity."

The Chicago Tribune's Howard Reich found the album to be inferior to Lage's live performances. He wrote "The power of this music proved significantly greater in concert than on the recording" and "What often sounds static and predictable on disc becomes dramatically more vibrant and detailed in concert". John Fordham quips in The Guardian that a "downside of the music is a sometimes becalmed over-refinement".

In Patrick Ferrucci's New Haven Register review, he called the release "a cohesive and entertaining jazz journey". All About Jazz managing editor wrote "a formed voice that transcends yet incorporates his multifaceted stylistic interests, Lage's impressive debut points to a giant in the making". AllMusic's Michael G. Nastos called the album "as impressive a debut recording as you'll hear" and Lage "a legitimate rising star".

Tracks

Personnel
 Julian Lage – guitar
 Béla Fleck – banjo on "The Informant", "Long Day, Short Night", and "Alameda"
 Chris Thile – mandolin on "The Informant", "Long Day, Short Night", and "Alameda"
 Ben Roseth – saxophone on "Clarity", "All Purpose Beginning", "Peterborough", "Quiet, Through and Through", and "Motor Minder"
 Taylor Eigsti – piano on "Tour One" and "All Blues"
 Aristides Rivas – cello on "Clarity" and "All Purpose Beginning"
 Jorge Roeder – bass on "Clarity", "All Purpose Beginning", "Quiet, Through and Through", "Lil' Darlin'", and "Motor Minder"
 Tupac Mantilla – hand percussion on "Clarity", "All Purpose Beginning", "Lil' Darlin'", and "Motor Minder"

Charts

References

2009 albums
Julian Lage albums
EmArcy Records albums